The Ambassador of Malaysia to the Republic of Chile is the head of Malaysia's diplomatic mission to Chile. The position has the rank and status of an Ambassador Extraordinary and Plenipotentiary and is based in the Embassy of Malaysia, Santiago.

List of heads of mission

Chargés d'Affaires to Chile

Ambassadors to Chile

See also
 Chile–Malaysia relations

References 

 
Chile
Malaysia